George Relph, CBE (27 January 1888 – 24 April 1960) was an English actor. He acted in more than a dozen films, and also many plays. He served in the British Army in the First World War, and was shot in the leg, hindering his return to acting. But Relph eventually got back on stage, and his career continued. His son, Michael, became a producer in the British film industry. His last role was Tiberius in the 1959 film version of Ben Hur which was released five months before Relph's death.

Filmography 
 The Lure of Woman (1915) as Sleeping Wolf aka John Found
 The Butterfly on the Wheel (1915) as Collingwood
 The Ballet Girl (1916) as Maurice Avery
 Her Maternal Right (1916) as Emory Townsend
 Paying the Price (1916) as Paul Towne
 The Door That Has No Key (1921) as Jack Scorrier
 Candytuft, I Mean Veronica (1921) as George Anstruther
 The Ghoul (1933) as Doctor (uncredited)
 Too Dangerous to Live (1939) as Manners
 Now You're Talking (1940) as Spy
 Give Us the Moon (1944) as Otto
 Nicholas Nickleby (1947) as Mr. Bray
 I Believe in You (1952) as Mr. Dove
 The Titfield Thunderbolt (1953) as Vicar Sam Weech
 The Final Test (1953) as Syd Thompson
 Doctor at Large (1957) as Dr. Farquarson
 Davy (1957) as Uncle Pat
 Ben-Hur (1959) as Tiberius Caesar (final film role)

Stage work
The Silver King (1902 – 1903, Prince's Theatre, Bristol)
Kismet (1911-1912, Knickerbocker Theatre, New York) as Kafur
The Yellow Jacket (1912-1913, Fulton Theatre)  as Wu Hoo Git (Young Hero of the Wu Family)
Romeo and Juliet (1915, 44th Street Theatre, New York) as Romeo (for Herbert Beerbohm Tree)
The Darling Of The Gods (1913 – 1914, His Majesty’s Theatre)
Joseph And His Brethren (1913 – 1914, His Majesty’s Theatre) as Joseph (for Beerbohm Tree)
Fair and Warmer (1918, Prince of Wales Theatre) as Philip Evans
The Race with the Shadow (1920 – 1921, Royal Court Theatre)
The Bat (1922, St James's Theatre) as Brooks
The Way of an Eagle (1922 – 1923, Prince's Theatre, Bristol)
The Green Goddess (1923 – 1924, St James’s Theatre)
The Monster (1928, Strand Theatre) as Michael Bruce
Shall We Join The Ladies? (1929, Palace Theatre) as Mr Gourlay
Sybarites (1929, Arts Theatre) as Con Delaney
Almost a Honeymoon (1930 –  1931, Garrick Theatre and  Apollo Theatre) as Charles (replacement)
 A Kiss for Cinderella (started 1934, His Majesty’s Theatre ) as Courtier
The Squeaker (started 1937, Strand Theatre) as Sutton
The Doctor’s Dilemma (1943, Theatre Royal Haymarket) as Dr Blenkinsop
Uncle Vanya (1945, Old Vic Company at the New Theatre) as Telegin (Waffles)
Peer Gynt (1944 – 1945, Old Vic at New Theatre) as Solvieg's Father/ Strange Passenger
Richard III (1944 – 1945, Old Vic at New Theatre) as George, Duke of Clarence/Cardinal Bouchier
Henry IV, Part 1 (1945,  Old Vic at New Theatre)  as Earl of Worcester
Henry IV, Part 2 (1945-1946, Old Vic at New Theatre ) as Pistol
Oedipus Rex (1945 – 1946, Old Vic at New Theatre) as Herdsman
The Critic (1945 – 1946, Old Vic at New Theatre) as Mr Dangle
Cyrano de Bergerac (1946 – 1947, Old Vic at New Theatre) as Ligniere
King Lear (1946-1947, Old Vic at New Theatre) as Earl of Gloucester
The Taming of the Shrew (1947 – 1948, Old Vic at New Theatre) as Grumio
The School for Scandal (1948 - 1949, Old Vic Company, and Australian Tour) as Sir Oliver Surface
Antigone (1949,  Old Vic at New Theatre) as Creon
Richard III (1949, Old Vic at New Theatre) as Duke of Buckingham
Fading Mansion  (1949, Duchess Theatre) as Cormack Joyce
Venus Observed (1950, St James’s Theatre) as Herbert Reedbeck
The Gioconda Smile (1950, Lyceum Theatre and Fulton Theatre, New York) as Dr Libbard
Ardèle (1951, Royal Court Theatre, Liverpool) as The General
The Mortimer Touch (1952, Duke of York's Theatre) as The Duke of Applecross
The Bad Samaritan (1953, Criterion Theatre & Duchess Theatre) as The Dean 
The Little Glass Clock (1954, Aldwych Theatre) as The Abbe Matignon
I Capture the Castle (1954, Aldwych Theatre) as James Mortmain
The Wild Duck (1955, Saville Theatre) as Old Ekdal
The Seagull (1956, Saville Theatre) as Sorin
 The Entertainer (1957, Royal Court Theatre) as Billy Rice

References

External links
 

George Relph in AusStage

1888 births
1960 deaths
English male film actors
English male silent film actors
20th-century English male actors
People from Cullercoats
Male actors from Tyne and Wear
British expatriate male actors in the United States
British Army personnel of World War I
Commanders of the Order of the British Empire